The Storm (Dutch: De Storm) is a 2009 Dutch disaster film by Ben Sombogaart.

Plot
A terrible storm causes hundreds of dikes to break in Zeeland, resulting in the North Sea flood of 1953. Julia, a single mother living with her parents, is caught in the middle of the catastrophic flood. She is rescued from drowning and taken to safety by her neighbour Aldo, who is a member of the armed forces. However, her baby is left in a wooden box in the attic of Julia's parental home. Together Julia and Aldo return to the disaster area to look for the baby. When they finally find the box, it is empty, and they conclude that someone must have taken the child. The child ended up with a woman who recently lost her own baby in a car accident. Julia met her but because the woman did not want to lose the baby, she hid him from Julia. Eighteen years later, Julia meets her son and the woman again and she finds out what has happened.

Cast
Sylvia Hoeks - Julia
Barry Atsma - Aldo
Dirk Roofthooft - Julia's Father
Monic Hendrickx - Julia's Mother
Katja Herbers - Krina
Lottie Hellingman - Stientje
Marlon Paris - Pietje

American award
In July 2010 The Storm won the 'Award for Outstanding Achievement in Filmmaking' on the Stony Brook Film Festival in New York City. Producer De Levita and actress Hoeks were attending.

References

External links
  
 

2009 films
Dutch action films
2000s disaster films
Films directed by Ben Sombogaart
2000s Dutch-language films